Amir Khan II surnamed Mir Miran the son of Khalilullah Khan Yezdi was a nobleman of high rank in the time of the Mughal emperors Shah Jahan and Alamgir and a great favorite of the latter. He was subedar (or governor) of Kabul. He died in Kabul on April 28, 1698, and the emperor conferred the title of Amir Khan III on his son.

Mughal Subahdars
Year of birth unknown
1698 deaths